Onthophagus hecate, the scooped scarab, is a species of dung beetle in the family Scarabaeidae.

Subspecies
These two subspecies belong to the species Onthophagus hecate:
 Onthophagus hecate blatchleyi Brown, 1929
 Onthophagus hecate hecate (Panzer, 1794)

References

Further reading

External links

 

Scarabaeinae
Articles created by Qbugbot
Beetles described in 1794